The 2019–20 Tunisian Cup (Coupe de Tunisie) or Habib Bourguiba Cup was the 88th season of the football cup competition of Tunisia.
The competition was organized by the Fédération Tunisienne de Football (FTF) and open to all clubs in Tunisia.

First round

Second round

Round of 32

Round of 16

Quarter-finals

Semi-finals

Final

See also
2019–20 Tunisian Ligue Professionnelle 1

References

External links
 Fédération Tunisienne de Football

Tunisian Cup
Tunisia
1